Rap Life is the debut solo studio album by American rapper Tash. It was released on November 2, 1999 via Loud Records. Recording sessions took place at Skip Saylor Recording, Enterprise Studios, Troposphere Studios, Mirror Image Studios, and Soundcastle. Production was handled by E-Swift, Fredwreck, Minnesota, Rockwilder, DJ Battlecat, Knobody, Younglord and Sir Jinx. It features guest appearances from Tha Alkaholiks, Phil Da Agony, B-Real, Carl Thomas, Kurupt, L.V., Outkast, Philip Johnson, Raekwon, Xzibit and Ice-T. The album reached number 148 on the Billboard 200, number 28 on the Top R&B/Hip-Hop Albums and topped the Heatseekers Albums chart in the United States. Its singles—"Rap Life" and "Bermuda Triangle"—were minor success landing on the Hot Rap Songs at No. 45 and 39, respectively.

Track listing

Charts

Singles

References

External link

1999 debut albums
Loud Records albums
Tash (rapper) albums
Albums produced by Knobody
Albums produced by Fredwreck
Albums produced by Rockwilder
Albums produced by Battlecat (producer)